At least three ships of the British Royal Navy have been named HMS Locust, for the insect.

  was a 14-gun brig, launched at Deptford in 1801, that served in the Channel and was sold in 1814.
  was a paddle-steamer , launched in 1840 and sold in 1895. 
She was completed in 1896 and scrapped in 1919.

References

Royal Navy ship names